This is the discography documenting albums and singles released by American singer Jody Watley.

Albums

Studio albums

Live albums

Compilation albums

Remix albums

EPs

Singles

Featured singles

Video compilations

Music videos

References

Notes

Citations

External links

Rhythm and blues discographies
Discographies of American artists